The 2001 Superbike World Championship was the fourteenth FIM Superbike World Championship season. The season started on 11 March at Valencia and finished on 30 September at Imola after 13 rounds.

Troy Bayliss won the riders' championship and Ducati won the manufacturers' championship.

Race calendar and results

Championship standings

Riders' standings

Manufacturers' standings

Entry list

References

Superbike World Championship
Superbike World Championship seasons